Shaxi may refer to the following towns in China:

Shaxi, Zhangpu (沙西镇), town in Zhangpu County, Fujian
Written as "沙溪镇":
Shaxi, Chao'an, in Chao'an County, Guangdong
Shaxi, Shaoguan, Qujiang District, Shaoguan, Guangdong
Shaxi, Zhongshan, Guangdong
Shaxi, Miluo, in Miluo City, Hunan
 Shaxi, Huitong (沙溪乡), a township of Huitong County, Hunan.
Shaxi, Taicang, Jiangsu
Shaxi, Shangrao, in Xinzhou District, Shangrao, Jiangxi
Shaxi, Yongfeng, in Yongfeng County, Jiangxi
Shaxi, Tongjiang, in Tongjiang County, Sichuan
Shaxi, Jianchuan County, Yunnan
Shaxi, Xinchang, in Xinchang County, Zhejiang